Monoxenus unispinosus is a species of beetle in the family Cerambycidae. It was described by Stephan von Breuning in 1939.

It is 11.5 mm long and 5 mm wide, and its type locality is Tanga, Tanzania.

References

unispinosus
Beetles described in 1939
Taxa named by Stephan von Breuning (entomologist)